Dudi Sela was the defending champion but chose not to defend his title.

Alex de Minaur won the title after defeating Dan Evans 7–6(7–4), 7–5 in the final.

Seeds

Draw

Finals

Top half

Bottom half

References
Main Draw
Qualifying Draw

Nottingham Open - Men's Singles
Men's Singles